Leishman is a surname, and may refer to:

 Alan Leishman, Australian garden administrator and amateur ornithologist
 Jim Leishman (born 1953), Scottish Labour Party politician and former professional footballer
 John George Alexander Leishman (1857–1924), American businessman and diplomat
 Ken Leishman (1931–1979), also known as the Flying Bandit or the Gentleman Bandit, Canadian criminal responsible for multiple robberies between 1957 and 1966
 Larry Leishman (1947–2013), Scottish-born Canadian guitarist
 Marc Leishman (born 1983), Australian golfer 
 Mark Leishman (born 1956), New Zealand broadcaster
 Melanie Leishman (born 1989), Canadian actress
 Phillip Leishman (1951–2013), New Zealand broadcaster
 Tommy Leishman (1937–2021), Scottish professional footballer
 William Boog Leishman (1865–1926), Scottish pathologist and British Army medical officer best known for discovering Leishmaniasis and preparing Leishman stain